The Book of Tongues is a 2008 book by Rustum Kozain that undertakes a journey through illusion and disillusion.

This article uses text taken from Chimurengal Library under the GFDL

References and external links
 Rustum Kozain biography - 
 Rustum Kozain's blog -  
 Poems by Rustum Kozain -  
 Rustum Kozain on Poetry International - 

South African non-fiction books
2008 non-fiction books